Helga Maria Schmid (born 8 December 1960 in Dachau, West Germany) is a German diplomat who has been serving as the Secretary General of the Organization for Security and Co-operation in Europe (OSCE) since 2020.

Prior to that appointment (from 2016 until 2020), she was the Secretary General of the European External Action Service (EEAS).

Education
Schmid has advanced degrees in Literature, History and Politics from the Ludwig Maximilian University of Munich. She also studied International and European Union law, Economics and International relations at the Diplomatic Academy of Vienna.

Career
From 1988 Schmid worked in various positions within the German Federal Foreign Office and was assistant private secretary to the minister for European Affairs between 1990 and 1991. From 1991 to 1994 she was the press and public affairs officer for the German embassy in Washington, D.C., under successive ambassadors Jürgen Ruhfus and Immo Stabreit. From 1994 to 1998 Schmid worked as a political adviser to Foreign Minister Klaus Kinkel. She held the same position from 1998 to 2000 with Foreign Minister Joschka Fischer. Between 2000 and 2005, she followed various executive positions at the headquarters of the Foreign Office in Berlin. Among them she was Head of the Political Staff and Head of the Ministerial Office from 2003 to 2005.

In 2006, Schmid became Director of the Policy Planning and Early Warning Unit of the High Representative for Common Foreign and Security Policy, Javier Solana, in the General Secretariat of the Council of the European Union in Brussels.

Following the founding of the European External Action Service, Schmid became deputy secretary-general for political affairs in 2010, serving under secretary general Pierre Vimont. In this capacity, she was involved in negotiations for the Nuclear program of Iran. The task was to negotiate with Abbas Araghchi and continue the high level discussions, while the technical level was ongoing. In the negotiations for the EU-3 nuclear agreement with Iran, Schmid was the lead author of the 100-page treaty which was successfully concluded in 2015, while holding the consent of current president Rouhani, who at the time was the Iranian Chief Negotiator in the Nuclear Dispute.

In September 2020, on the recommendation of Heiko Maas, Schmid was nominated by the German government of Chancellor Angela Merkel as a candidate to become secretary-general of the Organization for Security and Co-operation in Europe (OSCE). On 4 December 2020, she was formally appointed to the position.

Other activities 
 Center for International Peace Operations (ZIF), Member of the International Advisory Board

Recognition 
In November 2015, Foreign Minister Frank-Walter Steinmeier awarded her the Federal Cross of Merit class I.

Quotes
"Women are the better negotiators."
"When it comes to the solution to the Syria crisis, the EU position is clear: a lasting solution to the conflict can only be achieved through a Syrian-led political process leading to a transition. Which means obviously that you also talk to the representatives of the Assad regime."

References

External links

 Curriculum Vitae in German on the homepage of the EEAS (PDF file; 109 kB)
 Curriculum Vitae in English on the EEAS homepage (PDF file; 60 kB)
 Political breakfast with Helga Schmid  (Körber Foundation)

1960 births
Living people
Ludwig Maximilian University of Munich alumni
20th-century German diplomats
German women diplomats
21st-century German diplomats
Officers Crosses of the Order of Merit of the Federal Republic of Germany
OSCE Secretaries General
20th-century German women
21st-century German women